Theisen's is a regional retail chain of 21 stores in Iowa and 3 stores in Wisconsin.  The company headquarters are in Dubuque, Iowa.  Theisen's stores sell hunting and fishing equipment, appliances, houseware, automotive goods, apparel, household hardware, lawn and garden supplies, paint, pet supplies, sporting goods, farm 
and ranch supplies, livestock feed, and tools.

History
Theisen's was founded in 1927 as Theisen Battery & Electric by Leo and Kathryn Theisen, and was located on 8th Street in downtown Dubuque, Iowa.  In 1948 the company became the Theisen-O'Neill Tire Company, before being known as Theisen Distributing, and then assumed its current name of Theisen Supply, Inc.

Theisen's, in recent years in a few locations has also been known for its popcorn machine, for shopping customers.

Initially based in Dubuque with one store, the company opened a second store in Maquoketa, Iowa in 1957.  During the 1960s and 1970s the company opened additional stores in Anamosa, Dyersville, Tipton, DeWitt, and Monticello.  In 1979 Theisen's left the 8th Street store, moving the retail operation to its current location on Dodge Street (US Route 20).  In recent years the company has expanded to new locations, such as Marshalltown, Charles City, Indianola and Cedar Rapids, relocated several stores to larger facilities, and built an addition on to the Dubuque store.

In 2016, Brannon Dixon was named president.

References

External links 
 Theisen's website

Farm and ranch supply stores of the United States
Retail companies established in 1927
Companies based in Iowa
Economy of Dubuque, Iowa
Agriculture companies established in 1927
American companies established in 1927